Sheikh Salahuddin Ahmed (10 February 1969 – 29 October 2013) was a Bangladeshi international cricketer.

He was born in Rajapur, Khulna, and played in six One Day Internationals (ODIs) in 1997. He continued to play first-class cricket for Khulna Division until 2006.

Salahuddin died in October 2013 from a cardiac arrest. A minute of silence was held in his memory before the ODI between Bangladesh and New Zealand at Dhaka later on the same day.

References

External links
 

1969 births
2013 deaths
Bangladesh One Day International cricketers
Bangladeshi cricketers
Khulna Division cricketers
People from Khulna District